Oxyrhopus trigeminus , the Brazilian false coral snake, is a species of snake in the family Colubridae.  The species is native to Brazil, Bolivia, and Peru.

References

Oxyrhopus
Snakes of South America
Reptiles of Brazil
Reptiles of Bolivia
Reptiles of Peru
Reptiles described in 1854
Taxa named by André Marie Constant Duméril
Taxa named by Gabriel Bibron
Taxa named by Auguste Duméril